Sea Breeze is a census-designated place (CDP) in New Hanover County, North Carolina, United States. The population was 1,969 at the 2010 census, up from 1,312 in 2000. It is part of the Wilmington Metropolitan Statistical Area.

Geography
Sea Breeze is located at  (34.063540, -77.898722).

Demographics

As of the census of 2000, there were 1,312 people, 546 households, and 407 families residing in the CDP. The population density was 806.0 people per square mile (310.8/km). There were 643 housing units at an average density of 395.0/sq mi (152.3/km). The racial makeup of the CDP was 81.94% White, 15.85% African American, 0.38% Native American, 0.61% Asian, 0.23% from other races, and 0.99% from two or more races. Hispanic or Latino of any race were 1.52% of the population.

There were 546 households, out of which 23.6% had children under the age of 18 living with them, 65.0% were married couples living together, 6.8% had a female householder with no husband present, and 25.3% were non-families. 19.2% of all households were made up of individuals, and 7.0% had someone living alone who was 65 years of age or older. The average household size was 2.40 and the average family size was 2.74.

In the CDP, the population was spread out, with 18.4% under the age of 18, 5.5% from 18 to 24, 25.1% from 25 to 44, 34.5% from 45 to 64, and 16.6% who were 65 years of age or older. The median age was 46 years. For every 100 females, there were 97.9 males. For every 100 females age 18 and over, there were 93.7 males.

The median income for a household in the CDP was $41,836, and the median income for a family was $46,023. Males had a median income of $32,120 versus $26,029 for females. The per capita income for the CDP was $21,608. About 13.2% of families and 14.1% of the population were below the poverty line, including 29.3% of those under age 18 and 14.0% of those age 65 or over.

References

Census-designated places in New Hanover County, North Carolina
Census-designated places in North Carolina
Cape Fear (region)